Maréchal-des-logis Pierre Marie Joseph Cardon (30 October 1894 – 4 December 1987) was a French World War I balloon buster credited with five aerial victories over enemy observation balloons.

Biography

Pierre Marie Joseph Cardon was born 30 October 1894 in Armentières, France. He joined the French army on 29 August 1914, in the early days of World War I. He was transferred to aviation duty as a mechanic on 3 April 1916. In January 1917, he was sent to pilot's training. Upon completion, he was retained as an instructor until October, when he was forwarded for advanced training in single-seat airplanes. On 15 December 1917, he would be posted to Escadrille 81. During May and June 1918, in consort with other French pilots, he would undergo the extremely hazards of balloon busting five enemy observation balloons.

He is known to have won the Médaille Militaire and the Croix de Guerre.

Endnotes

References
 Franks, Norman; Bailey, Frank (1993). Over the Front: The Complete Record of the Fighter Aces and Units of the United States and French Air Services, 1914–1918. London, UK: Grub Street Publishing. .
 

1894 births
1987 deaths
French World War I flying aces